Associazione Calcio Milan lost their supremacy of Italian football, finishing just fourth in Serie A, also losing the Champions League final to Ajax. Marco van Basten was forced to end his career due to a knee injury, and the lack of goals scored was a main difference between Milan and champions Juventus, and even though Milan scored more goals than in 1993–94, the defensive line was not as unassailable as the season before.

Squad

Transfers

In

Out

Loans ended

Loans in

Loans out

Competitions

Serie A

League table

Results by round

Matches

Top scorers
  Marco Simone 17
  Dejan Savićević 9
  Gianluigi Lentini 5
  Giovanni Stroppa 3
  Ruud Gullit 3
  Daniele Massaro 3

Coppa Italia

Second round

Third round

Supercoppa Italiana

UEFA Champions League

Group stage

Knockout phase

Quarter-finals

Semi-finals

Final

Intercontinental Cup

European Super Cup

Statistics

Players statistics

References

Sources
 
  RSSSF – Italy 1994/95

A.C. Milan seasons
Milan